Erica caffra is a small tree, sometimes a shrub, that grows in riparian habitats and on forest edges and occurs from the Western Cape to the Drakensberg of KwaZulu-Natal and Lesotho. The tree's flowers look like bells. The tree's national tree number is 572.

References 

caffra
Flora of South Africa
Taxa named by Carl Linnaeus